Michal Sedláček (born 27 October 1988 in, Czech Republic) is a Czech football player who plays as a midfielder for Bohemians 1905 in the Czech First League.

References
 
 Guardian Football

Czech footballers
1988 births
Living people
Czech First League players
Bohemians 1905 players
FK Mladá Boleslav players
Sportspeople from Mladá Boleslav
Association football midfielders